The Bahia worm lizard (Leposternon polystegum) is a worm lizard species in the family Amphisbaenidae. It is found in Brazil.

This species demonstrates sexual dimorphism with the males having larger, longer bodies than the females.

Its diet generally consists of ants, earthworms, and termites.

References

Leposternon
Reptiles described in 1851
Taxa named by André Marie Constant Duméril
Endemic fauna of Brazil
Reptiles of Brazil